William Sheridan Allen (October 5, 1932 – March 14, 2013) was an American historian.

Biography
Allen was born in Evanston, Illinois, and studied at the universities of Michigan, Connecticut, and Minnesota, and in Germany at the Free University of Berlin and the University of Göttingen. The Nazi Seizure of Power (1965) was his first book. He also wrote The Infancy of Nazism and worked on studies of the effectiveness of Nazi propaganda and of the Social Democratic underground in the Third Reich.  He retired in 2001 as professor of history at the State University of New York at Buffalo. 

Allen wrote two books on Adolf Hitler debunking the assertion that he came to power through violence. Rather, Allen claims, Hitler's Nazi movement "seized power" in an act akin to democratic tactics. 

His most famous book, The Nazi Seizure of Power: The Experience of a Single German Town 1930–1935, was written to explain how one city, (Northeim, Germany, in the book with the fictional name of Thalburg) fell into the Nazi trap.  Fed by Nazi propaganda, many people of Thalburg, especially in the middle classes, in the midst of the Depression saw the Nazis as a way to get their country back to greatness that Hitler and the Nazis promised they would do. The book was widely reviewed and extremely influential.

References

External links

University of Michigan alumni
University of Connecticut alumni
University of Minnesota alumni
Free University of Berlin alumni
University of Göttingen alumni
University at Buffalo faculty
Historians of Nazism
1932 births
2013 deaths
Historians of Germany
American historians
American expatriates in Germany